Logan Carlisle Ramsey Jr. (March 21, 1921 – June 26, 2000) was an American character actor of television and film for nearly 50 years.

Early life
Ramsey was born in Long Beach, California, the son of Harriet Lillian (née Kilmartin) and Captain Logan Carlisle Ramsey Sr., USN, a Naval Aviator who raised the alarm during the attack on Pearl Harbor and later became the captain of the aircraft carrier USS Block Island (CVE-21). The junior Ramsey served as a Naval Aviator aboard the sunken Block Island'''s namesake carrier, USS Block Island (CVE-106). During down time, Ensign Ramsey would participate in "smokers" (entertainment programs between boxing matches) aboard ship. After the war he moved to New York City and studied acting under famous acting coach Lee Strasberg.

Stage, television, and film
Logan's Broadway credits include The Great Indoors (1965), In the Summer House (1953), The High Ground (1950), and The Devil's Disciple (1950).

Primarily  a TV character actor, Ramsey was a frequent guest star on series television during the 1960s and '70s. Ramsey appeared on, among many others: The Edge of Night; Star Trek (as Proconsul Claudius Marcus in "Bread and Circuses", 1968); Mission: Impossible; Hawaii Five-O; M*A*S*H; Maude; Charlie's Angels; Quincy, M.E.; Mork & Mindy; Battlestar Galactica (as Moore in "Experiment in Terra", 1979); Knight Rider; Night Court; Highway to Heaven and the miniseries Testimony of Two Men; The Winds of War and  Here Come the Brides.

Ramsey's film roles included Banning (1967), the Monkees film Head (1968), Childish Things (1969), The Reivers (1969), The Traveling Executioner (1970), What's the Matter with Helen? (1971), Jump (1971), John Witter in the original Walking Tall film trilogy, Some Call It Loving (1973), Busting (1974), Cornbread, Earl and Me (1975), Treasure of Matecumbe (1976), Mean Dog Blues (1978), Any Which Way You Can (1980, as the husband of his real wife Anne Ramsey), The Beast Within (1982), Joysticks (1983), Scrooged (1988, with his wife Anne Ramsey), and Pass the Ammo (1988).

Personal life
Ramsey was married to actress Anne Ramsey from 1954 until her death from cancer in 1988.

Death
On June 26, 2000, Ramsey died from a heart attack in Los Angeles, California.

Selected filmography

A Face in the Crowd (1957) - TV Director (uncredited)
The Hoodlum Priest (1961) - George Hale
Something Wild (1961) - Bit Part (uncredited)
Banning (1967) - Doc Brewer
How to Steal the World (1968) - Ship's Captain
Head (1968) - Off. Faye Lapid
Pendulum (1969) - Detective Jelinek
Childish Things (1969) - Mr. Simmons
The Reivers (1969) - Walter Clapp
The Traveling Executioner (1970) - La Follette
Jump (1971) - Babe Duggers
The Sporting Club (1971) - Scott
What's the Matter with Helen? (1971) - Detective Sgt. West
Glass Houses (1972)
Outside In (1972) - Uncle Albert
Walking Tall (1973) - John Witter
Some Call It Loving (1973) - Carnival Doctor
Busting (1974) - Dr. Berman
Cornbread, Earl and Me (1975) - Deputy Coroner
Farewell, My Lovely (1975) - Commissioner
Walking Tall Part 2 (1975) - John Witter
Treasure of Matecumbe (1976) - Coley
Walking Tall: Final Chapter (1977) - John Witter
Mean Dog Blues (1978) - Edmund Oberlin
Any Which Way You Can (1980) - Luther Quince
The Beast Within (1982) - Edwin Curwin
Joysticks (1983) - Mayor Neville
Say Yes (1986) - George
Pass the Ammo (1988) - Jim Bob Collins
Dr. Hackenstein (1988) - Xavier Rhodes
Scrooged (1988) - Man in Shelter
Meet the Hollowheads (1989) - Top Drone
Fat Man and Little Boy (1989) - Brehon Somervell

References

External links
 

1921 births
2000 deaths
American male film actors
American male television actors
United States Navy officers
Male actors from Long Beach, California
20th-century American male actors
United States Navy pilots of World War II